Scott Thomson may refer to:

Scott A. Thomson, taxonomist and herpetologist
Scott Y. Thomson (born 1966), Scottish football goalkeeper
Scott M. Thomson (born 1972), Scottish footballer
Scott Thomson (actor) (born 1957), American actor
Scott Thomson (baseball) (born 1968), American college baseball coach

See also
Scott Thompson (disambiguation)